Charles Humbert Thomas (24 June 1915 – 14 January 1976) was a Progressive Conservative party
member of the House of Commons of Canada. He was born in Fredericton, New Brunswick and became a businessman and wholesaler by career.

He was first elected at the Moncton riding in the 1968 general election, then re-elected there in the 1972 election. Charlie Thomas left federal office when he was defeated at Moncton by independent candidate Leonard Jones in the 1974 federal election.

Electoral history

References

External links
 

1915 births
1976 deaths
Members of the House of Commons of Canada from New Brunswick
Politicians from Fredericton
Progressive Conservative Party of Canada MPs